Korata is one of the kebeles in the Amhara Region of Ethiopia. It is the location of the former town of Korata.

During the 19th century, Korata was one of the holiest places in Ethiopia and a major settlement. Korata became a sacred place after a nun, Waldt-Máryam, miraculously saved the settlement from an attack by Oromo invaders. Consequently, Waldt-Máryam became venerated as a saint and Korata became a holy town. Only the head of the Ethiopian church and the emperor were allowed to ride mules or horses on the town's streets.

Korata was known for its beauty and well-built houses of stone. The town contained so many large trees that, from a distance, it could be difficult to tell it was a major settlement.

References 

Populated places in Ethiopia